The Ford N refers to the following:
Ford Model N an automobile made between 1906 and 1908
Ford N Series Tractors line of tractors made between 1939 and 1954